Colne Bridge is an historic 18th-century bridge near Huddersfield, West Yorkshire, England. A  Grade II listed stone-built arch bridge, it spans the River Colne between Bradley and Kirkheaton. A Colne Bridge was mentioned in the Fountains Abbey records of the 12th century. It gave its name to a village, and also to Colne Bridge Mill which was destroyed by fire in 1818.

According to Ted Ruddock, Colne Bridge may have been the design inspiration for John Smeaton's work on the Blackfriars Bridge.

References

Bridges in West Yorkshire
Grade II listed bridges
Grade II listed buildings in West Yorkshire